The Rights and Freedoms Party (abbreviated HAK-PAR) is a Kurdish nationalist political party in Turkey.

Advocating federalism as a means of increasing Kurdish autonomy in the south-east of the country, the party split from the Democratic People's Party (DEHAP) in 2002. The party's head office is in Diyarbakır. Until his death in October 2015, the party was headed by Fehmi Demir.

In the local elections of 2014, the party won the municipal mayoralty in Konukbekler, Muş, attaining 43,846 votes. In the June 2015 general election, HAK-PAR participated for the first time in a general election, winning 58,698 votes.

List of Leaders

Elections

General elections

Local elections

References

2002 establishments in Turkey
Federalist parties
Kurdish nationalist political parties
Kurdish political parties in Turkey
Left-wing parties
Left-wing politics in Turkey
Political parties established in 2002
Political parties in Turkey